Altenpleen is an Amt in the district of Vorpommern-Rügen, in Mecklenburg-Vorpommern, Germany. The seat of the Amt is in Altenpleen.

The Amt Altenpleen consists of the following municipalities:
Altenpleen
Groß Mohrdorf
Klausdorf
Kramerhof
Preetz
Prohn

Ämter in Mecklenburg-Western Pomerania